Strict nature reserves are specific areas in Finland which have been established for scientific reasons. Their primary purpose is the conservation of nature and research. The regulations for the nature reserves are much stricter than those for the national parks of Finland. It is usually not permitted to travel inside the areas, although some areas have trails open for the public. The strict nature reserves cover a total area of 1,530 km2.

There are a total of 19 strict nature reserves in Finland. 17 of them are managed by the Metsähallitus and 2 by the Forest Research Institute Metla.

List of nature reserves
 Häädetkeidas
 Karkali
 Kevo
 Koivusuo
 Malla
 Maltio
 Olvassuo
 Paljakka
 Pelso
 Pisavaara
 Runkaus
 Salamanperä
 Sompio
 Sukerijärvi
 Sinivuori
 Ulvinsalo
 Vaskijärvi
 Vesijako
 Värriö

See also
Protected areas of Finland